Jack Rabbit is an "out and back" wooden roller coaster located at Seabreeze Amusement Park in Irondequoit, New York.  The Jack Rabbit is a terrain coaster that features seven dips, a helix, and a tunnel.  It opened on May 31, 1920.  Jack Rabbit is the fourth oldest operating roller coaster in the world and the second oldest in the United States. The oldest, Leap-The-Dips in Altoona, Pennsylvania, was closed from 1985 to 1999, making Jack Rabbit the oldest continuously operating coaster in the country.

Background 
When nearby Ontario Beach Park closed forever at the end of the 1919 season, Seabreeze found itself as the sole remaining amusement park in Rochester. The park set out on a decade of expansion that would transform a simple park with a few rides into the full-fledged amusement park that we enjoy today. The centerpiece of the 1920 expansion was the Jack Rabbit, a “mammoth-sized” wooden roller coaster that was described as “the largest roller coaster in New York State, outside of Coney Island” by the local newspaper. It was the fastest roller coaster in the world, and was visually stunning to passengers riding the electric trolley cars as they arrived at the park.

The Jack Rabbit was designed by John A. Miller (1872-1942), one of the greatest coaster designers of the era. It was constructed by Harry C. Baker (1887-1939) in just eight weeks using 120 workmen. The Jack Rabbit is the oldest existing coaster to feature Miller’s revolutionary under-friction wheel design that locks the coaster trains to the track, allowing for larger and steeper drops that produce greater speeds.

The Jack Rabbit, which opened on May 31, 1920, uses portions of the park’s natural topography. This allowed Miller to design an exciting out-and-back terrain coaster that was truly unique to Seabreeze. The ride features 2,130 feet of track with a thrilling 75-foot first drop, Miller’s signature camel-back, airtime-producing hills, and a tunneled helix with a final surprise drop through the ravine before returning to the station. The tunnel, a favorite part of the Jack Rabbit today, was added in 1928.

In 2020, the Jack Rabbit celebrated its centennial anniversary, making it the oldest continuously operating roller coaster in North America and the fourth oldest in the world.

Jack Rabbit Timeline 
1920 - Jack Rabbit opens on May 31, 1920.  It is the fastest roller coaster in the world.  The coaster utilizes John Miller's new underfriction system that securely fastens the cars to the track.  The ride is owned by the Rochester Coaster Corporation which is owned by two men in Michigan.  

1922 - Jack Kirby became the ride's manager and operator for the Rochester Coaster Corporation.  The Kirby family lived in the house that was located under the Jack Rabbit.  

1923 - A large fire in the south end of the park destroys the Jack Rabbit station, lift hill, and first drop.  

1924 - Jack Rabbit rebuilt and ready for opening day.  The new station building was larger and reconfigured.

1928 - Tunnel added to last drop through the ravine.

1940 - Sometime around 1940, Jack Kirby assumes ownership of the Jack Rabbit from the Rochester Coaster Corporation.  

1946 - New "safety" cars are added from National Amusement Devices.  Trains are stainless steel with red leather, and feature a locking lap bar.

1972 - Jack Kirby dies and the Long family assumes ownership of the Jack Rabbit.

1982 - During the winter of 1982-1983, the house under the Jack Rabbit is demolished. 

1989 - New trains are installed from D.H. Morgan Manufacturing.  The trains feature individual bucket seats and a safety bar that sits closer to the lap.  The new trains, being wider, required the Jack Rabbit track to be widened.  The station was reconfigured to permit flush loading, rather than having separate loading and unloading areas.  

2007 - The station was renovated and the drop ceiling removed.  Revealed on the rafters was a relic from the past, a sign that said, "Pay as you Leave."   

2020 - Jack Rabbit celebrates its 100th anniversary, however Seabreeze is closed due to the COVID-19 pandemic.  The ride operates on several occasions for park staff, maintaining the record as the oldest continuously operating roller coaster in North America.  An updated brake system was installed using compressed air to assist with the raising and lowering of the brakes.  This was necessary due to steel beams being used for the brake to provide better functionality, which resulted in the brakes being too heavy to operate manually.  

2021 - Jack Rabbit has a proper birthday celebration at 101 years old.

Historical Facts & Information

Coaster Trains 

1920-1945 (top image):  Original trains by John Miller, featuring bench seats with an open front. As was customary for coaster cars during that era, there were no locking lap bars or seat belts, and the trains were equipped with rigid handles for riders to hold on to. On the busiest days, the Jack Rabbit operated three trains of three cars, each holding twenty-four passengers per ride.

1946-1988 (center):  Trains by National Amusement Devices (NAD), featuring a sleek stainless-steel body with a headlight on the front. These trains featured the latest in coaster car safety:  the locking lap bar. The trains were refurbished in 1978 and the stainless steel body was replaced with solid Formica, one train in red, and the other in green. Each train had three cars, holding 18 passengers per ride.

1989-Today (bottom):  The train by Morgan Manufacturing, features individual bucket seats and an updated lap bar design that sits closer to the lap, providing additional comfort and safety. This train has trailered fiberglass cars which provide for a smoother ride, and also reduces the wear & tear on the track and structure, helping to preserve the Jack Rabbit for generations to come. Along with the addition of this train came a redesign of the loading platform, converting it to a modern “flush loading” design where passengers load and unload at the same stop. This resulted in a streamlined operation with increased capacity.

Pay As You Leave 

When visiting Seabreeze in 1920, admission to the park was included in your trolley fare. Each attraction within the park was individually priced, and you’d pay at the cashier booth located at the attraction’s exit. On the Jack Rabbit, each passenger was given a serial-numbered punch-card upon boarding, which the operator would punch after each trip around the track. Upon exiting, you would surrender your punch-card to the cashier, and pay the total fare due. A relic from the past, the words “Pay As You Leave” can still be seen painted on an overhead beam in the station.

Drive Wheel 

A giant drive wheel, which once pulled the Jack Rabbit to the top of the first hill, is now on display in the Carousel Museum.  It’s ten feet in diameter, made of maple wood, and weighs 1,000 pounds. A 12-inch leather belt strapped around the wheel generated enough force to pull the train to the top. This old style machinery has since been replaced by a modern drive system.

Recognition 
On August 15, 2015 the American Coaster Enthusiasts (ACE) recognized the Jack Rabbit as an ACE Roller Coaster Landmark, a designation reserved for rides of truly historic significance. The renowned group of roller coaster fans “commended the management of Seabreeze on its continued operation and preservation of a historic classic during its 95th year of operation”. Coaster buffs from all across the country descended upon Seabreeze that day, to help us celebrate this new landmark status.

Ride Location 
Jack Rabbit runs north-south.  It is located on the southern side of the park property, running along the east side of the parking lot (parking lot #1).  On the east side of the Jack Rabbit is Park Grove rode.  In 1920, this area was the picnic grove.  In the park, the Jack Rabbit is surrounded by the Flying Scooters (on the north), the Log Flume (on the east), Bear Trax and Tilt-A-Whirl (on the west).

References

External links 
 Seabreeze site with photos and video
 Jack Rabbit on Roller Coaster Database

Roller coasters in New York (state)
Roller coasters introduced in 1920
1920 establishments in New York (state)